Ophellas or Ophelas (fl. c. 350 – 308 BC)  was an Ancient Macedonian soldier and politician. Born in Pella in Macedonia, he was a member of the expeditionary army of Alexander the Great in Asia, and later acted as Ptolemaic governor of Cyrene. His father's name was Seilenus.

India
Ophellas's name is first mentioned as a trierarch (commander of a trireme) of the fleet of Alexander the Great on the Indus in 326 BC.

Cyrenaica governor (322-c. 308)
After the death of Alexander, he followed the fortunes of Ptolemy I Soter, by whom he was sent, in 322 BC, at the head of a considerable army, to take advantage of the civil war which had broken out in Cyrenaica. This he successfully accomplished. Having totally defeated Thimbron and the party that supported him, he helped establish Ptolemaic control over Cyrene itself and its dependencies. The character of the new pro-Ptolemaic regime at Cyrene is illuminated by a lengthy constitutional document from Cyrene, preserved on stone, whose precise date remains controversial.

Ophellas' later career is somewhat obscure. Justin styles Ophellas "rex Cyrenarum", king of Cyrene, but it seems improbable that he had really assumed the regal title. He was married to Eurydice of Athens, a descendant of Miltiades, and appears to have maintained friendly relations with Athens. It seems likely that he was left by Ptolemy as governor of Cyrene, which he presumably continued to hold on behalf of Ptolemy until 309/8 BC: his name is not mentioned in the account given by Diodorus of the revolt of the Cyrenaeans in 313 BC, which was rapidly suppressed by Ptolemy.

He is next heard of in 309/8 BC, when Agathocles of Syracuse turned his attention towards Ophellas as likely to prove a useful ally in his war against the Carthaginians. In order to gain him over he promised to cede to him whatever conquests their combined forces might make in Africa, reserving to himself only the possession of Sicily. Ophellas gathered a powerful army from the homeland of his wife Euthydike where many citizens felt disgruntled after having lost their voting rights. Notwithstanding all the natural obstacles which presented themselves on his route, he succeeded in reaching the Carthaginian territories after a toilsome and perilous march of more than two months' duration. He was received by Agathocles with every demonstration of friendship, and the two armies encamped near each other: but not many days had elapsed when Agathocles betrayed his new ally, attacked the camp of the Cyrenaeans, and had Ophellas himself killed. The Cyrenean troops, left without a leader, went over to Agathocles.

Sometime after his death, the control of Cyrene was handed over to Magas of Cyrene, who was first a governor for the province before claiming independence from the Ptolemaic Kingdom and becoming king in 276 BC.

References
 

4th-century BC births
4th-century BC Macedonians
Ancient Pellaeans
Kings of Cyrene
Ptolemaic generals
Ptolemaic governors
Trierarchs of Nearchus' fleet
Rulers of Cyrenaica